The 1990 College Football All-America team is composed of college football players who were selected as All-Americans by various organizations and writers that chose College Football All-America Teams in 1990. The National Collegiate Athletic Association (NCAA) recognizes five selectors as "official" for the 1990 season. They are: (1) the American Football Coaches Association (AFCA); (2) the Associated Press (AP) selected based on the votes of sports writers at AP newspapers; (3) the Football Writers Association of America (FWAA); (4) the United Press International (UPI) selected based on the votes of sports writers at UPI newspapers; and (5) the Walter Camp Football Foundation (WC).  Other notable selectors included Football News, the Gannett News Service, Newspaper Enterprise Association in conjunction with World Almanac, Scripps Howard (SH), and The Sporting News (TSN).

Consensus All-Americans
The following charts identify the NCAA-recognized consensus All-Americans for the year 1990 and display which first-team designations they received.

Offense

Defense

Special teams

Offense

Quarterback
 Ty Detmer, Brigham Young (CFHOF) (AP-1, FWAA [tie], UPI-1, WCFF, FN, GNS, NEA-1, SH, TSN)
 Shawn Moore, Virginia (AFCA, AP-2, FWAA [tie], UPI-2, NEA-2)
 David Klingler, Houston (AP-3)

Running backs
 Eric Bieniemy, Colorado (AFCA, AP-1, FWAA, UPI-1, WCFF, FN, GNS, NEA-1, SH, TSN)
 Darren Lewis, Texas A&M (AFCA, AP-1, UPI-1, WCFF, FN, GNS, NEA-2)
 Greg Lewis, Washington (AP-2, NEA-1, UPI-2, WCFF, SH, TSN)
 Mike Mayweather, Army (AP-3, FWAA, UPI-2, NEA-2)
 Gerald Hudson, Oklahoma State (AP-2)
 Sheldon Canley, San Jose State (AP-3)

Wide receivers
 Raghib Ismail, Notre Dame (AFCA, AP-1 [kick returner], FWAA [kick returner], UPI-1, WCFF, FN, GNS, NEA-1, SH, TSN, FN)
 Herman Moore, Virginia (AP-1, UPI-1, NEA-1, FWAA, SH, TSN, FN)
 Lawrence Dawsey, Florida State (AP-1, FWAA, UPI-2, GNS)
 Ed McCaffrey, Stanford (AFCA, NEA-2)
 Manny Hazard, Houston (AP-3, UPI-2, SH)
 Wesley Carroll, Miami (AP-2)
 Patrick Rowe, San Diego State (AP-2)
 Jeff Graham, Ohio State (NEA-2)
 Bobby Slaughter, Louisiana Tech (AP-3)

Tight end
 Chris Smith, Brigham Young (AFCA, AP-1, FWAA, UPI-1, WCFF, FN, NEA-2, SH, TSN)
 Kerry Cash, Texas (NEA-1)
 Kirk Kirkpatrick, Florida (AP-2, UPI-2)
 Kelly Blackwell, Texas Christian (AP-3, GNS)

Tackles
 Antone Davis, Tennessee (AFCA, AP-1, FWAA, UPI-1, WCFF, FN, GNS, NEA-1, SH, TSN)
 Stacy Long, Clemson (AP-1, UPI-1, FWAA, TSN, FN)
 Greg Skrepenak, Michigan (UPI-2, WCFF, NEA-2)
 Bob Whitfield, Stanford (SH)
 Mike Sullivan, Miami (Fla.) (UPI-2, NEA-1)
 Pat Harlow, USC (AP-2, GNS)
 Stan Thomas, Texas (AP-2)
 Charles McCrae, Tennessee (AP-3, GNS)
 Mark Vander Poel, Colorado (NEA-2)
 Jeff Pahukoa, Washington (AP-3)

Guards
 Joe Garten, Colorado (AFCA, AP-1, UPI-1, NEA-1, WCFF, FWAA, SH, TSN, FN)
 Ed King, Auburn (AFCA, AP-1, UPI-1, NEA-1, WCFF, FWAA, SH, FN)
 Dean Dingman, Michigan (AFCA, AP-2, UPI-2, NEA-2, TSN)
 Eugene Williams, Iowa State (GNS)
 Eric Moten, Michigan State (AP-2, UPI-2)
 Mark Tucker, USC (AP-3, NEA-2)
 Ricky Byrd, Mississippi State (AP-3)

Center 
 John Flannery, Syracuse (AFCA, AP-1, UPI-1, WCFF, GNS, NEA-1, SH, TSN)
 Mike Arthur, Texas A&M (AP-2, FWAA)
 Mike Heldt, Notre Dame (AP-3, UPI-2, FN, NEA-2)

Defense

Defensive ends 
 Kenny Walker, Nebraska (AP-1, FWAA, UPI-2, FN, NEA-2, TSN)
 Huey Richardson, Florida (AP-1, UPI-2, FN [linebacker])
 Mitch Donahue, Wyoming (AP-2, FWAA, UPI-2, GNS, NEA-2, TSN)
 Steve Emtman, Washington (AP-2)
 Shane Dronett, Texas (AP-3)
 Kelvin Pritchett, Ole Miss (AP-3)

Defensive tackles
 Chris Zorich, Notre Dame (CFHOF) (AFCA, AP-1, UPI-1, NEA-1, WCFF, FWAA, SH, TSN, FN)
 Russell Maryland, Miami (CFHOF) (AFCA, AP-1, FWAA, UPI-1, WCFF, FN, GNS, NEA-1, SH, TSN)
 David Rocker, Auburn (AFCA, AP-2, UPI-1, NEA-1, WCFF)
 George Thornton, Alabama (AP-3)
 Frank Giannetti, Penn State (AP-3)

Nose guards
 Moe Gardner, Illinois (AFCA, AP-2, UPI-1, WCFF, GNS, NEA-2, SH)

Linebackers
 Michael Stonebreaker, Notre Dame (AFCA, AP-1, UPI,  NEA-1, WCFF, FWAA, TSN)
 Alfred Williams, Colorado (CFHOF) (AFCA [line], AP-1, FWAA, UPI, WCFF, FWAA, FN, GNS, NEA-1, SH, TSN)
 Maurice Crum, Miami,(Fla) (AP-1, UPI, NEA-1, WCFF, FWAA, TSN, FN)
 Scott Ross, USC (AFCA, UPI-2, SH)
 Mike Croel, Nebraska (AP-2, UPI-2, GNS, NEA-1, SH)
 Marco Coleman, Georgia Tech (NEA-2, SH)
 Darrick Brownlow, Illinois (AP-2, UPI-2, FN, NEA-2)
 Levon Kirkland, Clemson (AP-2, UPI-2, GNS)
 Roman Phifer, UCLA (GNS)
 Kirk Carruthers, Florida State (NEA-2)
 Melvin Foster, Iowa (NEA-2)
 Robert Jones, East Carolina (AP-3)
 Marvin Jones, Florida State (AP-3)
 Mark Sander, Louisville (AP-3)

Defensive backs
 Ken Swilling, Georgia Tech (AFCA, AP-1, FWAA, UPI-1, WCFF, FN, GNS [safety], NEA-1, SH, TSN)
 Tripp Welborne, Michigan (AFCA, AP-1 UPI-1, NEA-1, WCFF, FWAA, SH, TSN, FN)
 Darryll Lewis, Arizona (AFCA, AP-1, FWAA, UPI-1, WCFF, FN, NEA-2, TSN)
 Todd Lyght, Notre Dame (AFCA, AP-2, UPI-1, WCFF, GNS [cornerback], NEA-1, SH)
 Jesse Campbell, North Carolina State (AP-3, UPI-2, TSN, FN)
 Stanley Richard, Texas (AP-1)
 Merton Hanks, Iowa (AP-3, NEA-1)
 Will White, Florida (AP-3, FWAA, UPI-2, NEA-2)
 Eric Turner, UCLA (AP-2, UPI-2, GNS [safety], NEA-2, SH)
 Steve Jackson, Purdue (GNS [cornerback])
 Nathan LaDuke, Arizona State (AP-2, NEA-2)
 Terrell Buckley, Florida State (AP-2)
 Richard Fain, Florida (UPI-2)
 Kerry Valrie, Southern Mississippi (AP-3)

Special teams

Placekicker
 Philip Doyle, Alabama (AFCA, AP-1, UPI-1, NEA-1, WCFF, FWAA, SH, TSN, FN)
 Chris Gardocki, Clemson (AP-2, UPI-2)
 Roman Anderson, Houston (NEA-2)
 Michael Pollak, Texas (AP-3)

Punter
 Brian Greenfield, Pittsburgh (AP-2, FWAA, UPI-1, WCFF, NEA-2, SH, TSN)
 Cris Shale, Bowling Green (AFCA, AP-1, UPI-2, FN)
 Jason Hanson, Washington State (AP-3, GNS [kicker], NEA-1)

All-purpose / kick returners
 Dale Carter, Tennessee (AP-2, TSN)
 Desmond Howard, Michigan (AP-3)

Key 

 Bold – Consensus All-American
 CFHOF - Inducted into the College Football Hall of Fame
 -1 – First-team selection
 -2 – Second-team selection
 -3 – Third-team selection

Official selectors
 AFCA – selected by 3,000 active members of the American Football Coaches Association, also known as the "Kodak All-America Team"
 AP – Associated Press
 FWAA – Football Writers Association of America
 UPI – United Press International
 WCFF – Walter Camp Football Foundation

Other selectors
 FN – Football News
 GNS - Gannett News Service
 NEA – Newspaper Enterprise Association in conjunction with World Almanac
 SH - Scripps Howard
 TSN – The Sporting News

See also
 1990 All-Big Eight Conference football team
 1990 All-Big Ten Conference football team
 1990 All-Pacific-10 Conference football team
 1990 All-SEC football team

References

All-America Team
College Football All-America Teams